Vladimir Mikhailovich Dragomirov (1862–1928)  was a general in the Imperial Russian Army.

Life 
Dragomirov was the son of Mikhail Ivanovich Dragomirov, a prominent Russian General. His brother Abram Dragomirov was also a general in the Imperial Russian Army.

Dragomirov joined the Imperial Army, and in 1909 was appointed District Quartermaster for the Kiev Military District, with the rank of major general. He served as a general in the Russian army for most of the First World War. During the mobilization on July 19, 1914, he was appointed Chief of Staff of the Third Army. Dragomirov commanded the 8th Army Corps between 16.12.1914 – 23.03.1915 and again between 18.08.1915 – 16.10.1916. In between those two periods, Dragomirov served as Chief of Staff of the South-Western Front.

On 12 May 1915, he was dismissed due to "nervous exhaustion."  After a period of sick leave, he was transferred on the 16th of October 1916 to the post of commander of the 16th Army Corps. After the February Revolution, he was transferred to the reserve on April 2, 1917, and dismissed from service on August 22, 1917.

Following the Bolshevik October Revolution, Dragomirov aligned himself with the counter-revolution and took part in the Bredovsky expedition. After the defeat of the White forces in the Russian Civil War, he went into exile in Yugoslavia. He was a member of the regimental association of the Life Guards of the Semyonovsky Regiment, and served as chairman of the Russian Society of Officers of the General Staff.
He died of heart disease in Zemun (Yugoslavia) on January 29, 1928, where he was buried.

References

External links 
 Vladimir Dragomanov in Regiment.ru (in Russian)
 Vladimir Dragomanov in Hrono.ru (in Russian)

1862 births
1928 deaths
People from Chernigov Governorate
Imperial Russian Army generals
Russian military personnel of World War I
People of the Russian Civil War
White movement generals
Russian anti-communists
Russian untitled nobility